The Nister, also called the Great Nister to distinguish it from its tributary, the Black Nister, is a river in Rhineland-Palatinate, Germany.

The Nister is a right tributary of the Sieg. Its source is in the Westerwald hills, near Willingen. It flows south of Bad Marienberg and north of Hachenburg. Near Wissen the Nister flows into the Sieg.

It flows through the rocky upland region known as Kroppach Switzerland.

See also
List of rivers of Rhineland-Palatinate

Rivers of Rhineland-Palatinate
Rivers of the Westerwald
Rivers of Germany